Leigh Ryswyk (born 16 January 1985) is a former professional Australian rules footballer who played with the Brisbane Lions in the Australian Football League (AFL).

Ryswyk, a Victorian by birth, moved to Queensland as a child and represented his adopted state in the 2003 Under 18 Championship. After impressing on the wing for Southport, he was elevated from the rookie list prior to the 2005 AFL season.

AFL career

He made his debut in round 11, against Fremantle at Subiaco Oval and had four disposals, three of which were score assists in a convincing win for the Lions. A quad strain meant that he didn't retain his place for the next game and he made no further appearances. He was delisted at the end of the season.

South Australia
Ryswyk moved to South Australia in 2006 and was recruited by the North Adelaide in the South Australian National Football League.
Between 2006 and 2018 he played 226 games for the club. He has represented the SANFL four times in matches against interstate second-tier leagues, kicking ten goals.
As a player, he qualified for North Adelaide FC life membership in 2016, and for SANFL life membership in 2017.

References

1985 births
Australian rules footballers from Queensland
Brisbane Lions players
Southport Australian Football Club players
North Adelaide Football Club players
Living people